The 1988–89 Irish Cup was the 109th edition of Northern Ireland's premier football knock-out cup competition. It concluded on 6 May 1989 with the final.

Glentoran were the defending champions after winning their fourth consecutive Irish Cup the previous season by beating Glenavon 1–0 in the 1988 final. Their grip on the cup was finally broken by Linfield, who defeated them in the quarter-finals to inflict Glentoran's first Irish Cup defeat in 5 years. Ballymena United won the cup for the fifth time (sixth if you include Ballymena's record), defeating Larne 1–0 in the final. To date, this is Ballymena United's last cup success. In fact, they did not reach the final again until 2014.

The cup was expanded to 76 clubs this season, including more non-league clubs. There would now be five rounds, then the quarter-finals, semi-finals and the final.

Results

First round
Annalong Swifts, Downshire Young Men, RUC, Queen's University and Blue Circle all received byes into the second round.

|}

Second round

|}

Third round

|}

Fourth round
The 14 top flight clubs entered in this round, along with the seven third round winners, and 11 non-league clubs given byes to this round.

|}

Fifth round

|}

Replays

|}

Quarter-finals

|}

Replays

|}

Semi-finals

|}

Replays

|}

Final

References

1988–89
1988–89 domestic association football cups
Cup